This is a list of butterflies of Togo. About 414 species are known from Togo, none of which is endemic.

Papilionidae

Papilioninae

Papilionini
Papilio antimachus Drury, 1782
Papilio zalmoxis Hewitson, 1864
Papilio nireus Linnaeus, 1758
Papilio chrapkowskoides nurettini Koçak, 1983
Papilio sosia Rothschild & Jordan, 1903
Papilio cynorta Fabricius, 1793
Papilio dardanus Brown, 1776
Papilio phorcas Cramer, 1775
Papilio cyproeofila Butler, 1868
Papilio nobicea Suffert, 1904
Papilio demodocus Esper, [1798]
Papilio menestheus Drury, 1773

Leptocercini
Graphium antheus (Cramer, 1779)
Graphium policenes (Cramer, 1775)
Graphium liponesco (Suffert, 1904)
Graphium angolanus baronis (Ungemach, 1932)
Graphium leonidas (Fabricius, 1793)
Graphium adamastor (Boisduval, 1836)
Graphium agamedes (Westwood, 1842)
Graphium almansor carchedonius (Karsch, 1895)

Pieridae

Coliadinae
Eurema brigitta (Stoll, [1780])
Eurema desjardinsii marshalli (Butler, 1898)
Eurema regularis (Butler, 1876)
Eurema hecabe solifera (Butler, 1875)
Eurema senegalensis (Boisduval, 1836)
Catopsilia florella (Fabricius, 1775)

Pierinae
Colotis euippe (Linnaeus, 1758)
Colotis evagore antigone (Boisduval, 1836)
Nepheronia argia (Fabricius, 1775)
Nepheronia pharis (Boisduval, 1836)
Nepheronia thalassina (Boisduval, 1836)
Leptosia alcesta (Stoll, [1782])
Leptosia hybrida Bernardi, 1952
Leptosia marginea (Mabille, 1890)
Leptosia medusa (Cramer, 1777)
Leptosia wigginsi pseudalcesta Bernardi, 1965

Pierini
Appias epaphia (Cramer, [1779])
Appias phaola (Doubleday, 1847)
Appias sabina (Felder & Felder, [1865])
Appias sylvia (Fabricius, 1775)
Mylothris aburi Larsen & Collins, 2003
Mylothris chloris (Fabricius, 1775)
Mylothris jaopura Karsch, 1893
Mylothris poppea (Cramer, 1777)
Mylothris rhodope (Fabricius, 1775)
Mylothris schumanni Suffert, 1904
Belenois aurota (Fabricius, 1793)
Belenois calypso (Drury, 1773)
Belenois creona (Cramer, [1776])
Belenois hedyle (Cramer, 1777)
Belenois theora (Doubleday, 1846)

Lycaenidae

Miletinae

Liphyrini
Euliphyra leucyania (Hewitson, 1874)
Aslauga ernesti (Karsch, 1895)
Aslauga marginalis Kirby, 1890

Miletini
Megalopalpus metaleucus Karsch, 1893
Megalopalpus zymna (Westwood, 1851)
Spalgis lemolea lemolea Druce, 1890
Spalgis lemolea pilos Druce, 1890
Lachnocnema emperamus (Snellen, 1872)
Lachnocnema vuattouxi Libert, 1996

Poritiinae

Liptenini
Ptelina carnuta (Hewitson, 1873)
Pentila pauli Staudinger, 1888
Pentila petreia Hewitson, 1874
Pentila phidia Hewitson, 1874
Telipna acraea (Westwood, [1851])
Telipna semirufa (Grose-Smith & Kirby, 1889)
Mimacraea maesseni Libert, 2000
Mimacraea neurata Holland, 1895
Mimeresia libentina (Hewitson, 1866)
Liptena alluaudi Mabille, 1890
Liptena pearmani Stempffer, Bennett & May, 1974
Liptena rochei Stempffer, 1951
Liptena septistrigata (Bethune-Baker, 1903)
Tetrarhanis symplocus Clench, 1965
Larinopoda aspidos Druce, 1890
Eresiomera bicolor (Grose-Smith & Kirby, 1890)
Citrinophila erastus (Hewitson, 1866)
Citrinophila marginalis Kirby, 1887

Epitolini
Epitola posthumus (Fabricius, 1793)
Epitola urania Kirby, 1887
Epitola uranioides occidentalis Libert, 1999
Cerautola ceraunia (Hewitson, 1873)
Cerautola crowleyi (Sharpe, 1890)
Cerautola miranda (Staudinger, 1889)
Geritola gerina (Hewitson, 1878)
Stempfferia dorothea (Bethune-Baker, 1904)
Stempfferia kholifa (Bethune-Baker, 1904)
Stempfferia leonina (Staudinger, 1888)
Stempfferia zelza (Hewitson, 1873)
Cephetola cephena (Hewitson, 1873)
Cephetola collinsi Libert & Larsen, 1999
Cephetola sublustris (Bethune-Baker, 1904)
Epitolina dispar (Kirby, 1887)
Epitolina melissa (Druce, 1888)
Epitolina catori Bethune-Baker, 1904
Hypophytala benitensis (Holland, 1890)
Hypophytala hyettoides (Aurivillius, 1895)
Hypophytala ultramarina Libert & Collins, 1999
Aethiopana honorius (Butler, 1901)
Hewitsonia inexpectata (Bouyer, 1997)

Aphnaeinae
Pseudaletis agrippina Druce, 1888
Pseudaletis catori Bethune-Baker, 1926
Pseudaletis leonis (Staudinger, 1888)
Lipaphnaeus leonina ivoirensis Stempffer, 1966
Cigaritis avriko (Karsch, 1893)
Cigaritis mozambica (Bertoloni, 1850)
Axiocerses harpax (Fabricius, 1775)
Axiocerses amanga borealis Aurivillius, 1905

Theclinae
Myrina silenus (Fabricius, 1775)
Oxylides faunus (Drury, 1773)
Dapidodigma hymen (Fabricius, 1775)
Hypolycaena antifaunus (Westwood, 1851)
Hypolycaena dubia Aurivillius, 1895
Hypolycaena hatita Hewitson, 1865
Hypolycaena kakumi Larsen, 1997
Hypolycaena lebona (Hewitson, 1865)
Hypolycaena liara Druce, 1890
Hypolycaena philippus (Fabricius, 1793)
Iolaus eurisus (Cramer, 1779)
Iolaus aethria Karsch, 1893
Iolaus bellina (Plötz, 1880)
Iolaus iasis Hewitson, 1865
Iolaus laon Hewitson, 1878
Iolaus maesa (Hewitson, 1862)
Iolaus iulus Hewitson, 1869
Iolaus ismenias (Klug, 1834)
Iolaus alcibiades Kirby, 1871
Iolaus paneperata Druce, 1890
Iolaus theodori Stempffer, 1970
Iolaus calisto (Westwood, 1851)
Iolaus timon (Fabricius, 1787)
Pilodeudorix camerona (Plötz, 1880)
Pilodeudorix diyllus (Hewitson, 1878)
Pilodeudorix aucta (Karsch, 1895)
Pilodeudorix aurivilliusi (Stempffer, 1954)
Pilodeudorix catalla (Karsch, 1895)
Paradeudorix eleala viridis (Stempffer, 1964)
Paradeudorix moyambina (Bethune-Baker, 1904)
Hypomyrina mimetica Libert, 2004
Deudorix antalus (Hopffer, 1855)
Deudorix lorisona (Hewitson, 1862)

Polyommatinae

Lycaenesthini
Anthene amarah (Guérin-Méneville, 1849)
Anthene crawshayi (Butler, 1899)
Anthene irumu (Stempffer, 1948)
Anthene ligures (Hewitson, 1874)
Anthene liodes (Hewitson, 1874)
Anthene lunulata (Trimen, 1894)
Anthene lysicles (Hewitson, 1874)
Anthene rubricinctus (Holland, 1891)
Anthene starki Larsen, 2005
Anthene sylvanus (Drury, 1773)
Anthene chryseostictus (Bethune-Baker, 1910)
Anthene hades (Bethune-Baker, 1910)
Anthene lamias (Hewitson, 1878)
Anthene lucretilis (Hewitson, 1874)
Anthene nigeriae (Aurivillius, 1905)
Anthene phoenicis (Karsch, 1893)
Anthene rufoplagata (Bethune-Baker, 1910)
Cupidesthes leonina (Bethune-Baker, 1903)

Polyommatini
Cupidopsis cissus (Godart, [1824])
Cupidopsis jobates mauritanica Riley, 1932
Pseudonacaduba sichela (Wallengren, 1857)
Lampides boeticus (Linnaeus, 1767)
Uranothauma falkensteini (Dewitz, 1879)
Phlyaria cyara stactalla Karsch, 1895
Cacyreus lingeus (Stoll, 1782)
Leptotes pirithous (Linnaeus, 1767)
Tuxentius carana kontu (Karsch, 1893)
Zizeeria knysna (Trimen, 1862)
Zizina antanossa (Mabille, 1877)
Zizula hylax (Fabricius, 1775)
Azanus moriqua (Wallengren, 1857)
Azanus isis (Drury, 1773)
Eicochrysops hippocrates (Fabricius, 1793)
Euchrysops malathana (Boisduval, 1833)
Euchrysops osiris (Hopffer, 1855)
Thermoniphas micylus (Cramer, 1780)
Oboronia guessfeldti (Dewitz, 1879)
Oboronia ornata (Mabille, 1890)
Oboronia pseudopunctatus (Strand, 1912)
Oboronia punctatus (Dewitz, 1879)
Lepidochrysops parsimon (Fabricius, 1775)
Lepidochrysops quassi (Karsh, 1895)
Lepidochrysops synchrematiza (Bethune-Baker, [1923])
Lepidochrysops victoriae occidentalis Libert & Collins, 2001

Nymphalidae

Libytheinae
Libythea labdaca Westwood, 1851

Danainae

Danaini
Danaus chrysippus alcippus (Cramer, 1777)
Tirumala petiverana (Doubleday, 1847)
Amauris niavius (Linnaeus, 1758)
Amauris tartarea Mabille, 1876
Amauris crawshayi camerunica Joicey & Talbot, 1925
Amauris damocles (Fabricius, 1793)
Amauris hecate (Butler, 1866)

Satyrinae

Elymniini
Elymniopsis bammakoo (Westwood, [1851])

Melanitini
Gnophodes betsimena parmeno Doubleday, 1849
Gnophodes chelys (Fabricius, 1793)
Melanitis leda (Linnaeus, 1758)

Satyrini
Bicyclus angulosa (Butler, 1868)
Bicyclus campus (Karsch, 1893)
Bicyclus dorothea (Cramer, 1779)
Bicyclus istaris (Plötz, 1880)
Bicyclus italus (Hewitson, 1865)
Bicyclus madetes (Hewitson, 1874)
Bicyclus maesseni Condamin, 1971
Bicyclus mandanes Hewitson, 1873
Bicyclus milyas (Hewitson, 1864)
Bicyclus procora (Karsch, 1893)
Bicyclus safitza (Westwood, 1850)
Bicyclus martius (Fabricius, 1793)
Bicyclus sandace (Hewitson, 1877)
Bicyclus sangmelinae Condamin, 1963
Bicyclus sylvicolus Condamin, 1965
Bicyclus taenias (Hewitson, 1877)
Bicyclus vulgaris (Butler, 1868)
Bicyclus xeneas occidentalis Condamin, 1965
Heteropsis elisi (Karsch, 1893)
Ypthima doleta Kirby, 1880
Ypthima pupillaris Butler, 1888
Ypthimomorpha itonia (Hewitson, 1865)

Charaxinae

Charaxini
Charaxes varanes vologeses (Mabille, 1876)
Charaxes fulvescens senegala van Someren, 1975
Charaxes protoclea Feisthamel, 1850
Charaxes boueti Feisthamel, 1850
Charaxes lucretius Cramer, [1775]
Charaxes lactetinctus Karsch, 1892
Charaxes jasius Poulton, 1926
Charaxes epijasius Reiche, 1850
Charaxes castor (Cramer, 1775)
Charaxes brutus (Cramer, 1779)
Charaxes tiridates (Cramer, 1777)
Charaxes ameliae doumeti Henning, 1989
Charaxes etesipe (Godart, 1824)
Charaxes achaemenes atlantica van Someren, 1970
Charaxes eupale (Drury, 1782)
Charaxes subornatus couilloudi Plantrou, 1976
Charaxes anticlea (Drury, 1782)
Charaxes etheocles (Cramer, 1777)
Charaxes viola Butler, 1866
Charaxes paphianus falcata (Butler, 1872)
Charaxes lycurgus (Fabricius, 1793)
Charaxes doubledayi Aurivillius, 1899

Nymphalinae

Nymphalini
Vanessa cardui (Linnaeus, 1758)
Junonia chorimene (Guérin-Méneville, 1844)
Junonia hierta cebrene Trimen, 1870
Junonia oenone (Linnaeus, 1758)
Junonia orithya madagascariensis Guenée, 1865
Junonia sophia (Fabricius, 1793)
Junonia stygia (Aurivillius, 1894)
Junonia terea (Drury, 1773)
Junonia cymodoce (Cramer, 1777)
Salamis cacta (Fabricius, 1793)
Protogoniomorpha anacardii (Linnaeus, 1758)
Protogoniomorpha parhassus (Drury, 1782)
Protogoniomorpha cytora (Doubleday, 1847)
Precis octavia (Cramer, 1777)
Precis pelarga (Fabricius, 1775)
Hypolimnas anthedon (Doubleday, 1845)
Hypolimnas misippus (Linnaeus, 1764)
Hypolimnas salmacis (Drury, 1773)
Catacroptera cloanthe ligata Rothschild & Jordan, 1903

Cyrestinae

Cyrestini
Cyrestis camillus (Fabricius, 1781)

Biblidinae

Biblidini
Byblia anvatara crameri Aurivillius, 1894
Mesoxantha ethosea (Drury, 1782)
Ariadne enotrea (Cramer, 1779)
Neptidopsis ophione (Cramer, 1777)
Eurytela dryope (Cramer, [1775])
Eurytela hiarbas (Drury, 1782)

Epicaliini
Sevenia umbrina (Karsch, 1892)

Limenitinae

Limenitidini
Cymothoe caenis (Drury, 1773)
Pseudoneptis bugandensis ianthe Hemming, 1964
Pseudacraea eurytus (Linnaeus, 1758)
Pseudacraea lucretia (Cramer, [1775])
Pseudacraea semire (Cramer, 1779)

Neptidini
Neptis agouale Pierre-Baltus, 1978
Neptis conspicua Neave, 1904
Neptis najo Karsch, 1893
Neptis kiriakoffi Overlaet, 1955
Neptis metella (Doubleday, 1848)
Neptis morosa Overlaet, 1955
Neptis nemetes Hewitson, 1868
Neptis nysiades Hewitson, 1868
Neptis puella Aurivillius, 1894
Neptis serena Overlaet, 1955

Adoliadini
Catuna angustatum (Felder & Felder, 1867)
Catuna crithea (Drury, 1773)
Euryphura chalcis (Felder & Felder, 1860)
Euryphura togoensis Suffert, 1904
Hamanumida daedalus (Fabricius, 1775)
Aterica galene (Brown, 1776)
Cynandra opis (Drury, 1773)
Euriphene ampedusa (Hewitson, 1866)
Euriphene aridatha transgressa Hecq, 1994
Euriphene atossa (Hewitson, 1865)
Euriphene ernestibaumanni (Karsch, 1895)
Bebearia tentyris (Hewitson, 1866)
Bebearia mandinga (Felder & Felder, 1860)
Bebearia oxione (Hewitson, 1866)
Bebearia mardania (Fabricius, 1793)
Bebearia cocalia continentalis Hecq, 1988
Bebearia sophus (Fabricius, 1793)
Bebearia phantasina (Staudinger, 1891)
Bebearia demetra (Godart, 1824)
Euphaedra medon (Linnaeus, 1763)
Euphaedra xypete (Hewitson, 1865)
Euphaedra diffusa albocoerulea Hecq, 1976
Euphaedra sarcoptera (Butler, 1871)
Euphaedra themis (Hübner, 1807)
Euphaedra janetta (Butler, 1871)
Euphaedra ceres (Fabricius, 1775)
Euphaedra phaethusa (Butler, 1866)
Euphaedra edwardsii (van der Hoeven, 1845)
Euphaedra ruspina (Hewitson, 1865)
Euphaedra harpalyce (Cramer, 1777)
Euphaedra eupalus (Fabricius, 1781)
Euptera crowleyi (Kirby, 1889)
Euptera pluto occidentalis Chovet, 1998
Euptera zowa Fox, 1965
Pseudathyma falcata Jackson, 1969

Heliconiinae

Acraeini
Acraea eugenia Karsch, 1893
Acraea neobule Doubleday, 1847
Acraea quirina (Fabricius, 1781)
Acraea zetes (Linnaeus, 1758)
Acraea abdera eginopsis Aurivillius, 1899
Acraea egina (Cramer, 1775)
Acraea caecilia (Fabricius, 1781)
Acraea pseudegina Westwood, 1852
Acraea rogersi Hewitson, 1873
Acraea alcinoe Felder & Felder, 1865
Acraea epaea (Cramer, 1779)
Acraea umbra (Drury, 1782)
Acraea vestalis Felder & Felder, 1865
Acraea acerata Hewitson, 1874
Acraea alciope Hewitson, 1852
Acraea bonasia (Fabricius, 1775)
Acraea encedon (Linnaeus, 1758)
Acraea serena (Fabricius, 1775)
Acraea jodutta (Fabricius, 1793)
Acraea lycoa Godart, 1819
Acraea orestia Hewitson, 1874
Acraea peneleos Ward, 1871
Acraea pharsalus Ward, 1871
Acraea orina Hewitson, 1874
Acraea translucida Eltringham, 1912
Acraea perenna Doubleday, 1847

Vagrantini
Lachnoptera anticlia (Hübner, 1819)
Phalanta eurytis (Doubleday, 1847)
Phalanta phalantha aethiopica (Rothschild & Jordan, 1903)

Hesperiidae

Coeliadinae
Coeliades chalybe (Westwood, 1852)
Coeliades forestan (Stoll, [1782])
Coeliades hanno (Plötz, 1879)
Coeliades pisistratus (Fabricius, 1793)
Pyrrhochalcia iphis (Drury, 1773)

Pyrginae

Celaenorrhinini
Katreus johnstoni (Butler, 1888)
Celaenorrhinus galenus (Fabricius, 1793)
Celaenorrhinus proxima maesseni Berger, 1976
Eretis lugens (Rogenhofer, 1891)
Eretis melania Mabille, 1891
Eretis plistonicus (Plötz, 1879)
Sarangesa bouvieri (Mabille, 1877)
Sarangesa laelius (Mabille, 1877)
Sarangesa majorella (Mabille, 1891)
Sarangesa tertullianus (Fabricius, 1793)
Sarangesa thecla (Plötz, 1879)

Tagiadini
Tagiades flesus (Fabricius, 1781)
Eagris denuba (Plötz, 1879)
Eagris hereus quaterna (Mabille, 1890)
Eagris tetrastigma subolivescens (Holland, 1892)
Procampta rara Holland, 1892
Caprona adelica Karsch, 1892
Abantis bismarcki Karsch, 1892

Carcharodini
Spialia ploetzi occidentalis de Jong, 1977
Spialia spio (Linnaeus, 1764)
Gomalia elma (Trimen, 1862)

Hesperiinae

Aeromachini
Astictopterus abjecta (Snellen, 1872)
Astictopterus anomoeus (Plötz, 1879)
Gorgyra aretina (Hewitson, 1878)
Gorgyra diversata Evans, 1937
Gorgyra pali Evans, 1937
Ceratrichia nothus enantia (Karsch, 1893)
Pardaleodes edipus (Stoll, 1781)
Pardaleodes incerta murcia (Plötz, 1883)
Pardaleodes sator (Westwood, 1852)
Pardaleodes tibullus (Fabricius, 1793)
Xanthodisca astrape (Holland, 1892)
Osmodes laronia (Hewitson, 1868)
Osmodes thora (Plötz, 1884)
Acleros mackenii olaus (Plötz, 1884)
Semalea pulvina (Plötz, 1879)
Hypoleucis tripunctata Mabille, 1891
Meza meza (Hewitson, 1877)
Paronymus budonga (Evans, 1938)
Andronymus caesar (Fabricius, 1793)
Zophopetes cerymica (Hewitson, 1867)
Zophopetes ganda Evans, 1937
Artitropa comus (Stoll, 1782)
Mopala orma (Plötz, 1879)
Gretna balenge zowa Lindsey & Miller, 1965
Gretna cylinda (Hewitson, 1876)
Gretna waga (Plötz, 1886)
Pteroteinon laufella (Hewitson, 1868)
Leona leonora (Plötz, 1879)
Leona stoehri (Karsch, 1893)
Leona meloui (Riley, 1926)
Monza cretacea (Snellen, 1872)
Melphina flavina Lindsey & Miller, 1965
Melphina unistriga (Holland, 1893)
Fresna cojo (Karsch, 1893)
Fresna netopha (Hewitson, 1878)
Platylesches moritili (Wallengren, 1857)

Baorini
Pelopidas mathias (Fabricius, 1798)
Pelopidas thrax (Hübner, 1821)
Borbo borbonica (Boisduval, 1833)
Borbo fatuellus (Hopffer, 1855)
Borbo gemella (Mabille, 1884)
Borbo perobscura (Druce, 1912)

See also
Wildlife of Togo
List of moths of Togo

References

Seitz, A. Die Gross-Schmetterlinge der Erde 13: Die Afrikanischen Tagfalter. Plates
Seitz, A. Die Gross-Schmetterlinge der Erde 13: Die Afrikanischen Tagfalter. Text 

Togo

Togo
Togo
Butterflies